Contraindications to breastfeeding are those conditions that could compromise the health of the infant if breast milk from their mother is consumed. Examples include galactosemia, untreated HIV, untreated active tuberculosis, Human T-lymphotropic virus 1 or II, uses illicit drugs, or mothers undergoing chemotherapy or radiation treatment.

Breastfeeding contraindication are situations where the mother has conditions such as an addiction or disease that would make it harmful to the baby, should the baby be breastfed. Breast milk contains many nutrients that formulas in store shelves do not have which makes breast feeding a healthier and ideal way to feed an infant.[3]

Contraindications
Antenatal contraindications:
 Congenital Diaphragmatic Hernia
 Oesophageal atresia/ tracheo-oesophageal fistula
 Intestinal obstruction
 Imperforate anus
 Gastroschisi/omphalocele
Most Important - Galactosemia

Maternal contraindications:
 Mother on chemotherapy or recent/current use of radioactive agents
 Mother with human T-cell lymphotrophic viral infection, untreated brucellosis
 Mother having untreated (not yet sputum negative) open tuberculosis (but is still expressing breast milk and can feed)
 Alcohol consumption
 Drug Addiction
 Mother with suspected or untreated HIV.
Most Important - Galactosemia

T cell lymphotropic virus type 1 and 2 
An individual with T cell lymphotropic virus type 1 and 2 will have excessive amounts of  T-cell leukemia and HTLV-1. This often happens through the spread of needles and can affect anyone at any age. If a mother contains this virus and is not aware of it the spread to her infant can be at an all time high of 25%. There is currently no antivirals a mother can take to decrease the spread which is why breastfeeding is not recommended.

Alcohol 
Alcohol intake can also pose a threat to an infant, the fat content in your breast can cause toxins from alcohol to build up. It is advised that mothers only limit their drinking to one or two drinks a week so the spread of toxins does not reach the breast. If a mother is binge drinking while breastfeeding and the toxins spread to the infant; there will be a risk of slow weight gain for the infant.

References

Breastfeeding
Human female endocrine system